The maximum agreement subtree problem is any of several closely related problems in graph theory and computer science. In all of these problems one is given a collection of trees  each containing  leaves. The leaves of these trees are given labels from some set  with  so that no pair of leaves in the same tree sharing the same label, within the same tree the labelling for each leaf is distinct.

Formulations

Maximum homeomorphic agreement subtree
This version requires that the subtrees  are homeomorphic to one another.

Rooted maximum homeomorphic agreement subtree
This version is the same as the maximum homeomorphic agreement subtree, but we further assume that  are rooted and that the subtrees  contain the root node. This version of the maximum agreement subtree problem is used for the study of phylogenetic trees. Because of its close ties with phylogeny this formulation is often what is mean when one refers to the "maximum agreement subtree" problem.

Other variants 
There exits other formulations for example the (rooted) maximum isomorphic agreement subtree where we require the subtrees to be isomorphic to one another.

See also 
 Frequent subtree mining

References 

 

Computational problems in graph theory